This is a list of characters who have been played by multiple actors in the same film.  This does not include:
Stunt doubles/body doubles
Infants or very young children
Actors playing a younger/older version of a character in a brief flash-back/flash-forward (However, actors who play the same character at different ages for an extended portion of the movie may be included).
Large puppets or animatronic characters controlled by multiple performers
Characters with shape-shifting abilities who are almost always played by one actor except when using their abilities. (e.g. The T-1000 from Terminator 2: Judgment Day or Mystique from the X-Men films)  Exceptions may be made for characters for whom there is no one "default" actor.

Characters who swap identities

A
 Jodie Foster and Barbara Harris as Annabel and Ellen Andrews in Freaky Friday (1976)
 Shelley Long and Gaby Hoffmann as Ellen and Annabelle Andrews in Freaky Friday (1995)
 John Travolta and Nicolas Cage as Sean Archer in Face/Off (1997)

B
 Heidi Blickenstaff and Cozi Zuehlsdorff as Katherine and Ellie Blake in Freaky Friday (2018)
 Meg Ryan and Sydney Walker as Rita Boyle and Old Man in Prelude to a Kiss (1992)
 Samaire Armstrong and Kevin Zegers as Nell Bedworth and Woody Deane in It's a Boy Girl Thing (2006)

C
 Jamie Lee Curtis and Lindsay Lohan as Tess and Anna Coleman in Freaky Friday (2003)

D
 Meredith Salenger and Piper Laurie as Lainie Diamond in Dream a Little Dream (1989)
 Bruce Willis and Spencer Breslin as Russell/Rusty Duritz in Disney's The Kid (2000)

E
 Jason Robards and Corey Feldman as Coleman Ettinger in Dream a Little Dream (1989)
 Piper Laurie and Meredith Salenger as Gena Ettinger in Dream a Little Dream (1989)

H
 Dudley Moore and Kirk Cameron as Jack and Chris Hammond in Like Father Like Son (1987)

K
 Corey Feldman and Jason Robards as Bobby Keller in Dream a Little Dream (1989)

L
 Jason Bateman and Ryan Reynolds as Dave Lockwood in The Change-Up (2011)

P
 Ryan Reynolds and Jason Bateman as Mitch Planko in The Change-Up (2011)

S
 Judge Reinhold and Fred Savage as Marshall and Charlie Seymore in Vice Versa (1988)

T
 Heath Ledger, Johnny Depp, Jude Law, and Colin Farrell as Tony in The Imaginarium of Doctor Parnassus (2009)
This role was originally intended for Heath Ledger alone, but his death part way through production necessitated the use of other actors to complete the film.
 Nicolas Cage and John Travolta as Castor Troy in Face/Off (1997)

W
 George Burns and Charlie Schlatter as Jack and David Watson in 18 Again! (1988)

Characters who are played by different actors at different ages

A
 Robert De Niro and Scott Tiler as David "Noodles" Aaronson in Once Upon a Time in America (1984)
 Justin Spaulding and Majid R. Khaliq as Naeem Adisa in Music of the Heart (1999)
 Donald Dewar and Roland Varno as John Ainsley in The Return of the Vampire (1943)
 Gaby Hoffmann and Demi Moore as Samantha Albertson in Now and Then (1995)
 Tatiana Maslany and Helen Mirren as Maria Altmann in Woman in Gold (2015)
 Truman Hanks and Tom Hanks as Otto Anderson in A Man Called Otto (2022)
 Emonie Ellison and Juanita Jennings as Anita in A Man Called Otto (2022)
 Terry Moore and Ingrid Bergman as Paula Alquist Anton in Gaslight (1944)
 Javier Bardem and Unax Ugalde as Florentino Ariza in Love in the Time of Cholera (2007)
 Jena Malone and Jodie Foster as Dr. Eleanor "Ellie" Ann Arroway in Contact (1997)
 Hamilton Camp and Richard Burton as Philip Ashley in My Cousin Rachel (1952)
 Vivienne Jolie-Pitt, Eleanor Worthington Cox, Elle Fanning, and Janet McTeer as Aurora in Maleficent (2014)

B
 Martin Freeman and Ian Holm as Bilbo Baggins in The Hobbit: An Unexpected Journey (2012)
 Martin Freeman and Ian Holm as Bilbo Baggins in The Hobbit: The Battle of the Five Armies (2014)
 Bobbie Anderson and James Stewart as George Bailey in It's a Wonderful Life (1946)
 George Nokes and Todd Karns as Harry Bailey in It's a Wonderful Life (1946)
 Jean Gale and Donna Reed as Mary Hatch-Bailey in It's a Wonderful Life (1946)
 Ann Cusack and Barbara Erwin as Shirley Baker in A League of Their Own (1992)
 Annielo Mele and Orson Welles as Joseph Balsamo in Black Magic (1949)
 Billy Cook and Ray Milland as Scott Barnes in Men with Wings (1938)
 Filipe Vargas and Christopher Lee as Father Bartolomeu in Night Train to Lisbon (2013)
 David Moscow and Tom Hanks as Josh Baskin in Big (1988)
 David Kreps and Tom Hanks as Allen Bauer in Splash (1984)
 Jason Late and John Candy as Freddie Bauer in Splash (1984)
 Michel Piccoli and Wendelin Werner as Max Baumstein in The Passerby (1982)
 Brett Manley and Mark Wahlberg as John Bennett in Ted (2012)
 James Woods and Rusty Jacobs as Max Bercovicz in Once Upon a Time in America (1984)
 Ralph Fiennes and David Kross as Michael Berg in The Reader (2008)
 Jeanine Ann Roose and Gloria Grahame as Violet Bick in It's a Wonderful Life (1946)
 Sean Hayden and Bill Erwin as Arthur Biehl in Somewhere in Time (1980)
 Freddie Bartholomew and Tyrone Power as Jonathan Blake in Lloyd's of London (1936)
 Mayim Bialik and Bette Midler as Cecilia Carol "C.C." Bloom in Beaches (1988)
 Christopher McPherson, Albert Finney and Ewan McGregor as Edward Bloom in Big Fish (2003)
 Christopher Cook and Richard Burton as Edwin Booth in Prince of Players (1955)
 Louis Alexander and John Derek as John Wilkes Booth in Prince of Players (1955)
 Mimi Keene and Lily Collins as Edith Bratt in Tolkien (2019)
 Anthony Ippolito and Adam Sandler as Sam Brenner in Pixels (2015)
 Keshav Jadhav and Divian Ladwa as Mantosh Brierley in Lion (2016)
 Sunny Pawar and Dev Patel as Saroo Brierley in Lion (2016)
 Dominic Savage and Leon Vitali as Lord Bullingdon in Barry Lyndon (1975)
 Theophilus Webster and Ron Eldard as Mickey Bunce in Drop Dead Fred (1991)
 Ann Carter and Diana Lynn as Martha Burnside in Ruthless (1948)

C
 Haley Joel Osment and Josh Lucas as Walter Caldwell in Secondhand Lions (2003)
 Jessica Alba and Makenzie Vega as Nancy Callahan in Sin City (2005)
 Jason Patric and Joseph Perrino as Lorenzo "Shakes" Carcaterra in Sleepers (1996)
 Jessie Buckley and Olivia Colman as Leda Caruso in The Lost Daughter (2021)
 Ridge Canipe and Joaquin Phoenix as Johnny Cash in Walk the Line (2005)
 Jerry Hartleben and James Cagney as Lon Chaney in Man of a Thousand Faces (1957)
 Hugh Downer, Thomas Bradford and Robert Downey Jr. as Charlie Chaplin in Chaplin (1992)
 Roddy McDowell and Gregory Peck as Francis Chisholm in The Keys of the Kingdom (1944)
 Dickie Jones and Eddie Quillan as Adam Clay in Young Mr. Lincoln (1939)
 Jack Kelly and Richard Cromwell as Matt Clay in Young Mr. Lincoln (1939)
 Michael McLean, Scotty Beckett, Dickie Moore and Don Ameche as Henry Van Cleve in Heaven Can Wait (1943)
 Henry Blair, Douglas Croft and James Cagney as George M. Cohan in Yankee Doodle Dandy (1942)
 William Tracy and Pat O'Brien as Fr. Jerry Connolly in Angels with Dirty Faces (1938)
 Mackenzie Foy, Jessica Chastain, and Ellen Burstyn as Murphy Cooper in Interstellar (2014)
 Timothée Chalamet and Casey Affleck as Tom Cooper in Interstellar (2014)
 Jared Riley and Kevin James as Will "Chewie" Cooper in Pixels (2015)
 Morgana King and Francesca De Sapio as Mama Corleone in The Godfather Part II (1974)
 Jo Marr and Ben Kingsley as Cosmo in Sneakers (1992)
 Jess Barker and Otto Kruger as John Coudair in Cover Girl (1944)
 Phoebe Cates and Ashley Peldon as Lizzie Cronin in Drop Dead Fred (1991)
 Hanna R. Hall and Robin Wright as Jenny Curran in Forrest Gump (1994)

D
 E'Lon Cox and Richard Pryor as Jo Jo Dancer in Jo Jo Dancer, Your Life Is Calling (1986)
 Gwyneth Paltrow and Maggie Smith as Wendy Darling in Hook (1991)
 Emma Lockhart and Katie Holmes as Rachel Dawes in Batman Begins (2005)
 Dickie Moore and Hardie Albright as Dirk De Jong in So Big (1932)
 Tommy Rettig and Steve Forrest as Dirk De Jong in So Big (1953)
 James McAvoy and Jaeden Martell as Bill Denbrough in It Chapter Two (2019)
 Jan Handzlik and Roger Smith as Patrick Dennis in Auntie Mame (1958)
Kirby Furlong and Bruce Davison as Patrick Dennis in Mame (1974)
 Jade Yorker and Omari Toomer as DeSean in Music of the Heart (1999)
 Hailey McCann and younger sister Tatum McCann as Alba DeTamble in The Time Traveler's Wife (2009)
 Brooklynn Proulx and Rachel McAdams as Claire Abshire-DeTamble in The Time Traveler's Wife (2009)
 Alex Ferris and Eric Bana as Henry DeTamble in The Time Traveler's Wife (2009)
 Ashleigh Aston Moore and Rita Wilson as Chrissy DeWitt in Now and Then (1995)
 Gene Collins, David Holt and Bill Dickey (himself) as Bill Dickey in The Pride of the Yankees (1942)
 Noah Forgione and Jon Heder as Roy O. Disney in Walt Before Mickey (2015)
 Demitri Vardoulias, Owen Teague, and Thomas Ian Nicholas as Walt Disney in Walt Before Mickey (2015)
 Derrick De Marney and Hugh Miller as Benjamin Disraeli in Victoria the Great (1937)
 Antonella Attili and Pupella Maggio as Maria Di Vita in Cinema Paradiso (1988)
 Salvatore Cascio, Marco Leonardi, and Jacques Perrin as Salvatore Di Vita in Cinema Paradiso (1988)
 Charlotte Rampling and Beatriz Batarda as Adriana do Prado in Night Train to Lisbon (2013)
 Frankie Darro and Edward Woods as Matt Doyle in The Public Enemy (1931)

E
 Sarita Wooton and Merle Oberon as Catherine Earnshaw in Wuthering Heights (1939)
 Douglas Scott and Hugh Williams as Hindley Earnshaw in Wuthering Heights (1939)
 Ian Bohen and Kevin Costner as Wyatt Earp in Wyatt Earp (1994)
 Tom Courtenay and Marco d'Almeida as João Eça in Night Train to Lisbon (2013)
 Melody Thomas Scott and Tippi Hedren as Marnie Edgar in Marnie (1964)
 Tom Hanks and Dabbs Greer as Paul Edgecomb in The Green Mile (1999)
 Scotty Beckett and Louis Hayward as Oliver Essex in My Son, My Son! (1940)
 Mélanie Laurent and Lena Olin as Estefânia in Night Train to Lisbon (2013)

F
 Alina Brace and Keeley Karsten as Natalie Fabelman in The Fabelmans (2022)
 Birdie Borria and Julia Butters as Reggie Fabelman in The Fabelmans (2022)
 Mateo Zoryan Francis-DeFord and Gabriel LaBelle as Sammy Fabelman in The Fabelmans (2022)
 Donald O'Connor and Fred MacMurray as Pat Falconer in Men with Wings (1938)
 Sean Marquette and Mark Ruffalo as Matt Flamhaff in 13 Going on 30 (2004)
 David Holt and John Wood as Flavius in The Last Days of Pompeii (1935)
 Albie Whitaker and Matt Adler as Jeff Freeman in Flight of the Navigator (1986)
 Ashley House and Alan Arkin as Sigmund Freud in The Seven-Per-Cent Solution (1976)
 Moritz Bleibtreu and Kostja Ullmann as Klaus Freytag in Sources of Life (2013)

G
 Mickey Rooney and Clark Gable as Edward J. "Blackie" Gallagher in Manhattan Melodrama (1934)
 Malcolm McDowell and Paul Bettany as the gangster in Gangster No. 1 (2000)
 Justin Scheller and Mark Holton as Stillwell Gardner in A League of Their Own (1992)
 Billy O'Brien and Spencer Tracy as Tom Garner in The Power and the Glory (1933)
 James McCall and Robin Williams as T.S. Garp in The World According to Garp (1982)
 Renée Coleman and Shirley Burkovich as Alice "Skeeter" Gaspers in A League of Their Own (1992)
 Mary Thomas and Barbara Stanwyck as Fiona Gaylord in The Gay Sisters (1942)
 Douglas Croft and Gary Cooper as Lou Gehrig in The Pride of the Yankees (1942)
 Elizabeth McGovern and Jennifer Connelly as Deborah Gelly in Once Upon a Time in America (1984)
 Josh Pence and Liam Neeson as Ra's al Ghul in The Dark Knight Rises (2012)
 Albie Marber and Patrick Gibson as Robert Q. Gilson in Tolkien (2019)
 Tyler Steelman and Thomas Lennon as Ned Gold in 17 Again (2009)
 Bobs Watson and Walter Brennan as Peter Goodwin in Kentucky (1938)
 Delmar Watson and Charles Waldron as Thad Goodwin Jr. in Kentucky (1938)
 Freddie Simpson and Eugenia McLin as Ellen Sue Gotlander in A League of Their Own (1992)
 Frank Whaley and Burt Lancaster as Archibald "Moonlight" Graham in Field of Dreams (1989)
 Pamella Carrington-Coutte, Mercedes Ruiz, and Geraldine Chaplin as Tonya Gromeko in Doctor Zhivago (1965)
 Zoe Sternbach-Taubman and Molly Gia Foresta as Guadalupe in Music of the Heart (1999)
 Michael Conner Humphreys and Tom Hanks as Forrest Gump in Forrest Gump (1994)
 Julius Molnar Jr. and Conrad Veidt as Gwynplaine in The Man Who Laughs (1928)

H
 Jo Ann Marlowe and Hedy Lamarr as Jenny Hager in The Strange Woman (1946)
 Anne Ramsay and Barbara Pilavin as Helen Haley in A League of Their Own (1992)
 Chosen Jacobs and Isaiah Mustafa as Mike Hanlon in It Chapter Two (2019)
 Jeremy Ray Taylor and Jay Ryan as Ben Hanscom in It Chapter Two (2019)
 Mary Ashleigh Green and Sandra Bullock as Gracie Hart in Miss Congeniality (2000)
 Tim Hiser and Paul Maxwell as Panama Hat in Indiana Jones and the Last Crusade (1989)
 Morgan Brittany and Ann Jillian as June Havoc in Gypsy (1962)
 Stephen Peck, Johnny Calkins and Dane Clark as Danny Hawkins in Moonrise (1948)
 Jane La Verne and Laura La Plante as Magnolia Hawks in Show Boat (1929)
 Rex Downing and Laurence Olivier as Heathcliff in Wuthering Heights (1939)
 Cullen Johnson and Ralph Morgan as Henry in The Power and the Glory (1933)
 Sarah Hyland, Emmy Rossum, and Jennifer Love Hewitt as Audrey Hepburn in The Audrey Hepburn Story (2000)
 Stephen Joffe and Noah Emmerich as Gordo Hersch in Frequency (2000)
 Geena Davis and Lynn Cartwright as Dorothy "Dottie" Hinson in A League of Their Own (1992)
 Nicholas John Renner, Joseph Anderson, and Anthony Natale as Coltrane "Cole" Holland in Mr. Holland's Opus (1995)
 Michael Blagdon and Nicol Williamson as Sherlock Holmes in The Seven-Per-Cent Solution (1976)
 Hector Bateman-Harden and Will Ferrell as Sherlock Holmes in Holmes & Watson (2018)
 Megan Cavanagh and Patricia Wilson as Marla Hooch in A League of Their Own (1992)
 Tracy Reiner and Betty Miller as Betty "Spaghetti" Horn in A League of Their Own (1992)
 Dickie Jones and Cary Grant as Matt Howard in The Howards of Virginia (1940)
 Jacob Davich and Leonardo DiCaprio as Howard Hughes in The Aviator (2004)

I
 Janis Wilson and Barbara Stanwyck as Martha Ivers in The Strange Love of Martha Ivers (1946)

J
 Milla & Ruby Simmonds, Charlie & Smith Alexander-Powell, Olivia Sprague, Monique Heath, Sarah Snook and Ethan Hawke as Jane/John in Predestination (2014)
 Buster Phelps and Richard Carlson as Thomas Jefferson in The Howards of Virginia (1940)
 Johanna Wokalek and Lotte Flack as Joan in Pope Joan (2009)
 Dorothy Black and Fredi Washington as Peola Johnson in Imitation of Life (1934)
 Karin Dicker and Susan Kohner as Sarah Jane Johnson in Imitation of Life (1959)
 Curtis Harris and Anthony Mackie as William Johnson in Abraham Lincoln: Vampire Hunter (2012)
 Scotty Beckett and Larry Parks as Al Jolson in The Jolson Story (1946)
 Alex Hyde-White and Sean Connery as Henry Jones, Sr. in Indiana Jones and the Last Crusade (1989)
 River Phoenix and Harrison Ford as Indiana Jones in Indiana Jones and the Last Crusade (1989)
 Anthony Ingruber and Harrison Ford as William Jones in The Age of Adaline (2015)

K
 Josh Brolin and Tommy Lee Jones as Agent K in Men in Black 3 (2012)
 Jake Kaese, Kevin Schmidt, and Elden Henson as Lenny Kagan in The Butterfly Effect (2004)
 Buddy Swan and Orson Welles as Charles Foster Kane in Citizen Kane (1941)
 Jack Dylan Grazer and James Ransone as Eddie Kaspbrak in It Chapter Two (2019)
 Larry White and Donald O'Connor as Buster Keaton in The Buster Keaton Story (1957)
 Lori Petty and Kathleen Butler as Kit Keller in A League of Their Own (1992)
 Mason Alan Dinehart, Ralph Hodges and Kirk Alyn as Clark Kent in Superman (1948)
 Lee Quigley, Jeff East and Christopher Reeve as Clark Kent in Superman (1978)
 Stephan Bender and Brandon Routh as Clark Kent in Superman Returns (2006)
 Cooper Timberline, Dylan Sprayberry and Henry Cavill as Clark Kent in Man of Steel (2013)
 Jimmy Bennett and Chris Pine as James T. Kirk in Star Trek (2009)

L
 Wil Wheaton and Richard Dreyfuss as Gordie Lachance in Stand by Me (1986)
 Arthur Stone and Louis Hayward as Vic Lambdin in Ruthless (1948)
 Jacob Shinder and Josh Gad as Ludlow "The Wonder Kid" Lamonsoff in Pixels (2015)
 Alicia Witt and Joanna Gleason as Gertrude Lang in Mr. Holland's Opus (1995)
 Peggy McIntyre and Bonita Granville as Kit Latimer in Syncopation (1942)
 Cole Hawkins and Scott Cumberbatch as Lawrence in Music of the Heart (1999)
 Diane Pace and Natalie Wood as Gypsy Rose Lee in Gypsy (1962)
 Michael Fassbender and Ian McKellen as Erik Lehnsherr in X-Men: Days of Future Past (2014)
 Elva Josephson and Brooke Shields as Emmeline LeStrange in The Blue Lagoon (1980)
 Glenn Kohan and Christopher Atkins as Richard LeStrange in The Blue Lagoon (1980)
 Columba Powell and Carl Boehm as Mark Lewis in Peeping Tom (1960) 
 Danny Lloyd and Robert Conrad as G. Gordon Liddy in Will: G. Gordon Liddy (1982) 
 Lux Haney-Jardine and Benjamin Walker as Abraham Lincoln in Abraham Lincoln: Vampire Hunter (2012)
 Billy Simpson and Robby Benson as Tad Lincoln in The Last of Mrs. Lincoln (1976)
 Sacha Guitry and Georges Marchal as King Louis XIV of France in Royal Affairs in Versailles (1954)
 David Strathairn and Marvin Einhorn as Ira Lowenstein in A League of Their Own (1992)
 Victoria Gómez and Cristina Gómez as Lucy in Music of the Heart (1999)

M
 Shayla MacKarvich and Daryl Hannah as Madison in Splash (1984)
 Isobelle Molloy, Ella Purnell, and Angelina Jolie as Maleficent in Maleficent (2014)
 Dev Patel, Ayush Mahesh Khedekar, and Tanay Chheda as Jamal Malik in Slumdog Millionaire (2008)
 Gérard Depardieu and Guillaume Depardieu as Marin Marais in Tous les Matins du Monde (1991)
 Billy Crudup and Jonathan Tucker as Tommy Marcano in Sleepers (1996)
 Kirsten Dunst and Samantha Mathis as Amy March in Little Women (1994)
 Jessica Chastain and Sophia Lillis as Beverly Marsh in It Chapter Two (2019)
 Larry Olsen, James West and Richard Crane as Rusty Marsh in Happy Land (1943)
 Hallie Eisenberg and Embeth Davidtz as Amanda "Little Miss" Martin in Bicentennial Man (1999)
 Lindze Letherman and Angela Landis as Grace Martin in Bicentennial Man (1999)
 Christina Ricci and Rosie O'Donnell as Roberta Martin in Now and Then (1995)
 Margherita Caruso and Susanna Pasolini as Mary in The Gospel According to St. Matthew (1964)
 Darryl Hickman and Van Heflin as Sam Masterson in The Strange Love of Martha Ivers (1946)
 Douglas Croft and Ronald Reagan as Drake McHugh in Kings Row (1942)
 Jane Seymour and Susan French as Elise McKenna in Somewhere in Time (1980)
 Devin Brochu, Logan Miller, and Matthew McConaughey as Connor Mead in Ghosts of Girlfriends Past (2009)
 Jeremy Sumpter and Matthew McConaughey as Adam Meiks in Frailty (2002)
 Terry Burnham and Sandra Dee as Susie Meredith in Imitation of Life (1959)
 Jason Schaller, Jaryd Waterhouse, Jacob Haines, and Christopher Aydon as Michael "Mikey" in Look Who's Talking (1989)
 Sarah Widdows, Irene Gorovaia, and Amy Smart as Kayleigh Miller in The Butterfly Effect (2004)
 Cameron Bright, Jesse James, and William Lee Scott as Tommy Miller in The Butterfly Effect (2004)
 Bobby Cooper and Tim Holt as George Amberson Minafer in The Magnificent Ambersons (1942)
 Keith Allen, Michael Paye and Jonathan Rhys Meyers as George Amberson Minafer in The Magnificent Ambersons (2002)
 Scotty Beckett and Robert Cummings as Parris Mitchell in Kings Row (1942)
 Fred Coby and Rondo Hatton as Hal Moffat in The Brute Man (1946)
 Ann Todd and Ann Sheridan as Randy Monaghan in Kings Row (1942)
 Kathryn Prescott, Abby Ryder Fortson, and Emma Volk as C. J. Montgomery in A Dog's Journey (2019)
 Dennis Quaid, KJ Apa and Bryce Gheisar as Ethan Montgomery in A Dog's Purpose (2017)
 Madonna and Eunice Anderson as "All the Way" Mae Mordabito in A League of Their Own (1992)
 Scott Terra and Ben Affleck as Matt Murdock in Daredevil (2003)
 Rosie O'Donnell and Vera Johnson as Doris Murphy in A League of Their Own (1992)
 Tony Revolori and F. Murray Abraham as Zero Mustafa in The Grand Budapest Hotel (2014)

N
 Hugo E. Blick and Jack Nicholson as Jack Napier in Batman (1989)
 Daniel Gélin and Raymond Pellegrin as Napoleon in Napoléon (1955)
 Joseph Castanon, Jonah Hill, and Jake Hoffman as Ben Newman in Click (2006)
 Tatum McCann, Lorraine Nicholson, and Katie Cassidy as Samantha Newman in Click (2006)
 Nick Stahl and Robert DeDiemar, Jr. as Chuck Norstadt in The Man Without a Face (1993)
 Evan Farmer, Rob Lowe, and Robert Wagner as Number Two in Austin Powers in Goldmember (2002)

O
 Emma Thompson and Alice Eve as Agent O in Men in Black 3 (2012)
 Zac Efron and Matthew Perry as Mike O'Donnell in 17 Again (2009)
 Allison Miller and Leslie Mann as Scarlet O'Donnell in 17 Again (2009)
 Hank Azaria and Rip Torn as Patches O' Houlihan in Dodgeball: A True Underdog Story (2004)
 August Diehl and Bruno Ganz as Jorge O'Kelly in Night Train to Lisbon (2013)
 Gene Reynolds and Tyrone Power as Dion O'Leary in In Old Chicago (1938)
 Billy Watson and Don Ameche as Jack O'Leary in In Old Chicago (1938)
 Mickey Kuhn and Van Heflin as Walter O'Neil in The Strange Love of Martha Ivers (1946)
 Catriona MacColl and Patsy Kensit as Lady Oscar François de Jarjayes in Lady Oscar (1979)

P
 Matthew Van Ginkel, Max Hoffman, Ryan Francis, and Robin Williams as Peter Pan/Peter Banning in Hook (1991)
 Max Charles and Andrew Garfield as Peter Parker in The Amazing Spider-Man (2012)
 Adam Hann-Byrd and Robin Williams as Alan Parrish in Jumanji (1995)
 Michael Domeinco, Ron Berglas and George C. Scott as George S. Patton in The Last Days of Patton (1986)
 Jon Simmons and Michael Gough as Alfred Pennyworth in Batman and Robin (1997)
 María Luján Hidalgo and Madonna as Eva (Duarte) Perón in Evita (1996)
 Kasey Russell, Christa B. Allen and Jennifer Garner as Jenny Perotti in Ghosts of Girlfriends Past (2009)
 Irrfan Khan, Suraj Sharma, Ayush Tandon and Gautam Belur as Pi in Life of Pi (2012)
 Geoffrey Atkins and Robert Donat as William Pitt the Younger in The Young Mr. Pitt (1942)
 Andrew Bambridge and Peter Dinklage as Eddie "Fireblaster" Plant in Pixels (2015)
 Skippy Wanders, Freddie Mercer and Shepperd Strudwick as Edgar Allan Poe in The Loves of Edgar Allan Poe (1942)
 Dick Winslow and George Brent as Roelf Pool in So Big (1932)
 Richard Beymer and Walter Coy as Roelf Pool in So Big (1953)
 Lindy Wade and Ted North as Paul Porter in Syncopation (1942)
 Christopher Severn and Louis Hayward as Ephraim Poster in The Strange Woman (1946)
 Frank Coghlan Jr. and James Cagney as Tom Powers in The Public Enemy (1931)
 Darla Hood and Ann Rutherford as Lenore Prentiss in Happy Land (1943)
 Izabel Pearce and Ellen Burstyn as Flemming Prescott in The Age of Adaline (2015)
 Maria Pia Calzone and Alexa Summer as Viviana Preston in Equilibrium (2002)
 Juanita Quigley, Marilyn Knowlden, and Rochelle Hudson as Jessie Pullman in Imitation of Life (1934)

R
 Virginia Weidler and Louise Campbell as Peggy Ranson in Men with Wings (1938)
 Marilyn Knowlden and Sunnie O'Dea as Kim Ravenal in Show Boat (1936)
 Ryan Reynolds, Walker Scobell, and Isaiah Haegert as Adam Reed in The Adam Project (2022) 
 Ron Eldard and Geoffrey Wigdor as John Reilly in Sleepers (1996)
 Laval Schley and Peter Lawson Jones as Reuben in A Man Called Otto (2022)
 Dickie Moore and Edward G. Robinson as Paul Reuter in A Dispatch from Reuter's (1940)
 Eric Lloyd and Robert Downey, Jr. as Thomas Riley in Heart and Souls (1993)
 Christa B. Allen and Jennifer Garner as Jenna Rink in 13 Going on 30 (2004)
 Jack Johnson and Jared Harris as Will Robinson in Lost in Space (1998)
 Chris Evans and Patrick Gorman as Steve Rogers in Avengers: Endgame (2019)
 Frank Bank and Will Rogers Jr. as Will Rogers in The Story of Will Rogers (1952)
 Kate Winslet and Gloria Stuart as Rose in Titanic (1997) (The character was named Rose DeWitt Bukater in 1912 and Rose Dawson Calvert in 1996.)
 Tony Revolori and Benicio Del Toro as Moses Rosenthaler in The French Dispatch (2021)
 Robert Ellis and William Bendix as Babe Ruth in The Babe Ruth Story (1948)
 Harrison Young and Matt Damon as James Francis Ryan in Saving Private Ryan (1998)

S
 Eva Mendes and Seychelle Gabriel as Sand Saref in The Spirit (2008)
 Sharliee Collier and Nina Foch as Nikki Saunders in The Return of the Vampire (1943)
 Joseph Gordon-Levitt and Bruce Willis as Joseph Simmons in Looper (2012).  Played in the same time period via time travel.
 Jonathan Munk and Woody Allen as Alvy Singer in Annie Hall (1977)
 Andrew Gallagher and Henry Thomas as Johnny Sirocco in Gangs of New York (2002)
 Hayden Christensen and Sebastian Shaw as Anakin Skywalker in Return of the Jedi (1983)
 Hayden Christensen was edited in as Force Ghost of Anakin Skywalker in the DVD version of 2004.
 Jay Ward and George Meeker as Bill Smith in Emma (1932)
 Adam Bregman and Anthony Boyle as Geoffrey Smith in Tolkien (2019)
 Edith Fellows and Barbara Kent as Gypsy Smith in Emma (1932)
 Anne Shirley and Myrna Loy as Isabelle Smith in Emma (1932)
 Meret Becker and Corinna Harfouch as Sophie in The Promise (1995)
 Jacob Kogan, Zachary Quinto and Leonard Nimoy as Spock in Star Trek (2009)
 This case is unusual, in that Quinto and Nimoy played differently aged versions of the character, but in the same time period, via time travel.
 Balthazar Getty and Denis Biasi as Stadler in Mr. Holland's Opus (1995)
 Michael Higgins, Jackson Bews, and Sharlto Copley as Stefan in Maleficent (2014)
 James Caviezel and Daniel Henson as John Sullivan in Frequency (2000)
 Brad Pitt and Brad Renfro as Michael Sullivan in Sleepers (1996)
 Frankie Burke and  James Cagney as William "Rocky" Sullivan in Angels with Dirty Faces (1938)
 Tommy Ivo, Michael Dill and Lloyd Bridges as Jerry Sykes in Moonrise (1948)
 Dylan Day and Stephen Caffrey as Johnny Sylvester in The Babe (1992)

T
 Saoirse Ronan, Romola Garai, and Vanessa Redgrave as Briony Tallis in Atonement (2007)
 Thora Birch and Melanie Griffith as Tina Tercell in Now and Then (1995)
 Harry Lloyd and Jim Broadbent as Denis Thatcher in The Iron Lady (2011)
 Alexandra Roach and Meryl Streep as Margaret Thatcher in The Iron Lady (2011)
 Billy Gray and Burt Lancaster as Jim Thorpe in Jim Thorpe – All-American (1951)
 Damon Whitaker and Forest Whitaker as Bobby Tidd in Mr. Holland's Opus (1995)
 Lisa Wilhoit and Julia Roberts as Tinker Bell in Hook (1991)
 Guillermo Bedward and James MacCallum as Hilary Tolkien in Tolkien (2019)
 Harry Gilby and Nicholas Hoult as J. R. R. Tolkien in Tolkien (2019)
 Courtland Mead and Wil Horneff as Danny Torrance in The Shining (1997)
 Roger Dale Floyd and Ewan McGregor as Danny Torrance in Doctor Sleep (2019)
 Mary Thomas and Betty Field as Cassandra Tower in Kings Row (1942)
 Finn Wolfhard and Bill Hader as Richie Tozier in It Chapter Two (2019)
 Emma Thompson and Annie Buckley as P. L. Travers (Helen Goff as a child) in Saving Mr. Banks (2013)
 Logan Lerman, John Patrick Amedori, and Ashton Kutcher as Evan Treborn in The Butterfly Effect (2004)
 Jackie Brown, Dickie Jones and Fredric March as Mark Twain in The Adventures of Mark Twain (1944)
 Henry Dinhofer and Kieran Culkin as Lexi Tzavaras in Music of the Heart (1999)
 Michael Angarano and Charlie Hofheimer as Nick Tzavaras in Music of the Heart (1999)

U
 Wyatt Oleff and Andy Bean as Stanley Uris in It Chapter Two (2019)

V
 Cian McCormack and Leonardo DiCaprio as Amsterdam Vallon in Gangs of New York (2002)
 Isis Carmen Jones and Whoopi Goldberg as Deloris Wilson Van Cartier in Sister Act (1992)
 Bobby Anderson and Zachary Scott as Horace Woodruff Vendig in Ruthless (1948)
 Phillip Cooper and Wallace Beery as Pancho Villa in Viva Villa! (1934)

W
 Jimmy Butler and William Powell as Jim Wade in Manhattan Melodrama (1934)
 Josh Hutcherson and Dax Shepard as Walter in Zathura: A Space Adventure (2005)
 Codie-Lei Eastick and John C. Reilly as Dr. Watson in Holmes & Watson (2018)
 Charles Roskilly and Michael Keaton as Bruce Wayne in Batman (1989)
 Ramsey Ellis and Val Kilmer as Bruce Wayne in Batman Forever (1995)
 Eric Lloyd and George Clooney as Bruce Wayne in Batman and Robin (1997)
 Gus Lewis and Christian Bale as Bruce Wayne in Batman Begins (2005)
 Brandon Spink and Ben Affleck as Bruce Wayne in Batman v Superman: Dawn of Justice (2016)
 Aaron Keeling and Liev Schreiber as Orson Welles in RKO 281 (1999)
 Joseph Mazzello and Jim Carrey as Joe Wenteworth in Simon Birch (1998)
 Marcie Leeds and Barbara Hershey as Hillary Whitney in Beaches (1988)
 Ty Tennant and Tom Glynn-Carney as Christopher Wiseman in Tolkien (2019)
 Blair Dunlop and Johnny Depp as Willy Wonka in Charlie and the Chocolate Factory (2005)
 Alexandra Kyle and Judy Greer as Lucy "Tom-Tom" Wyman in 13 Going on 30 (2004)

X
 James McAvoy and Patrick Stewart as Charles Xavier in X-Men: Days of Future Past (2014)

Y
 Richard Vuu, Tsou Tijger, and John Lone as Pu Yi in The Last Emperor (1987)

Z
 Tarek Sharif and Omar Sharif as Yuri Zhivago in Doctor Zhivago (1965)

Characters played cooperatively by multiple actors at the same time
A
 Emani Sledge, Valerie Shusterov, Hannah Freiman, Rachel Corr, Will Denton, Sharon Wilkins, Shayna Levine, and Jennifer Jason Leigh as Aviva in Palindromes (2004)

C
 Carole Bouquet and Angela Molina were both cast in the role of Conchita in That Obscure Object of Desire (1977). They switched back and forth during the movie with no apparent pattern. Director Luis Buñuel had originally cast Maria Schneider for the role but could not work with her. When he decided to replace her, he joked about casting two actresses in the role. Producer Serge Silberman liked that idea and suggested Buñuel do it.

G
 Verne Troyer and Warwick Davis as Griphook in Harry Potter and the Philosopher's Stone (2001). American actor Verne Troyer's lines were dubbed by British actor Warwick Davis, who also played Professor Flitwick in this film (and subsequent Harry Potter films). Davis reprised his role as Griphook (both body and voice) in later instalments.

H
 Kien Shih and Keye Luke as Mr. Han in Enter the Dragon (1973)
Shih's English was very poor, so actor Keye Luke supplied his speaking voice.
 Arnold Schwarzenegger and an uncredited voice actor as Hercules in Hercules in New York (1970)
Schwarzenegger was cast based on his appearance, but the producers were initially unaware of his thick Austrian accent, and dubbed over his voice with a more classical voice actor. Some modern screenings of this have restored Schwarzenegger's voice to the film.

I
 Johnny Depp, Jude Law, and Colin Farrell as Imaginarium Tony in The Imaginarium of Doctor Parnassus (2009)
After the death of Heath Ledger one-third of the way through filming, production was shut down for a few months. Then it was re-started when the three actors agreed to complete Ledger's role.

L
 Jordan Warkol and Elizabeth Daily as Billy "Froggy" Laughlin in The Little Rascals (1994)
 Klinton Spilsbury and James Keach as The Lone Ranger in The Legend of the Lone Ranger (1981)
Spilsbury had the look, but his voice could not cut it. So, his lines were dubbed over by Keach.

M
 Lorene Yarnell and Joan Rivers as Dot Matrix in Spaceballs (1987)
Yarnell played Dot Matrix in costume, while Rivers provided the speaking voice.

O
 Noah Banks, Elizabeth Daily, Michael Haider, Billy Amman, Cristin Woodworth, and Zack O'Malley Greenburg as Lorenzo Odone in Lorenzo's Oil (1992)
Daily provided Lorenzo's vocal effects.

P
 Harvey Pekar and Paul Giamatti as Harvey Pekar in American Splendor (2003)

S
 Arnold Johnson and Robert Downey, Sr. as Putney Swope in Putney Swope (1969)
Downey dubbed over Johnson's speaking voice with his own.

T
 Toshishiro Obata and Michael McConnohie as Tatsu in Teenage Mutant Ninja Turtles (1990)

V
 David Prowse (physical performance) and James Earl Jones (voice) as Darth Vader in the original Star Wars Trilogy (1977, 1980, 1983)
Sebastian Shaw also played the role of Darth Vader un-masked in Return of the Jedi (1983) for a total of three actors in that film.
James Earl Jones reprised his voice role with Hayden Christensen playing the role in Star Wars: Episode III – Revenge of the Sith (2005)
Jones also reprised this role in Rogue One (2016), with Spencer Wilding and Daniel Naprous in the role of Vader
If all of the primary films in the franchise are counted together, Jake Lloyd from Star Wars: Episode I – The Phantom Menace (1999) can also be counted, bringing the total to seven actors.

W
 Vincent D'Onofrio and Maurice LaMarche as Orson Welles in Ed Wood (1994)
Director Tim Burton was frustrated with D'Onofrio's performance, so he hired LaMarche, known for his near-perfect Orson Welles voice impersonations, to do the voice-over work.

 Borderline cases 
 Edward Norton and Brad Pitt as Tyler Durden in Fight Club (1999)
 Penélope Cruz and Cameron Diaz as Sofia Serrano and Julianna 'Julie' Gianni in Vanilla Sky (2001)
 David Niven, Terence Cooper, Peter Sellers, Woody Allen, Barbara Bouchet, Daliah Lavi, Joanna Pettet, and Ursula Andress as James Bond 007 in Casino Royale (1967)
 Marcus Carl Franklin, Christian Bale, Cate Blanchett, Richard Gere, Heath Ledger, and Ben Whishaw as different facets of Bob Dylan in I'm Not There'' (2007)

See also 
 List of actors who have played multiple roles in the same film
 List of television programs in which one character was played by multiple actors

References

Lists of film characters